Jackson is a common American, Scottish, Irish and English surname. In 1980, Jackson was the 24th most common surname in England and Wales. In the 1990 United States Census, Jackson was the thirteenth most frequently reported surname, accounting for 0.3% of the population.

Jackson is also used as a first name.

Notable people with the name include:

Surname

Entertainment

Film and television
Amy Jackson (born 1992), British actress and model
Andrew Jackson (actor) (born 1963), Canadian actor
Anne Jackson (1925–2016), American actress
Anthony Jackson (actor) (1944–2006), English actor
Bill Jackson (television personality) (1935–2022), American TV personality
Charlotte Jackson (born 1978), English TV presenter
David Jackson (British actor) (1934–2005), British actor
Eugene Jackson (1916–2001), American actor
Frederick J. Jackson (1886–1953), American screenwriter
Gemma Jackson (born 1951), British art director
George Jackson (producer) (1958–2000), American film director and producer
Glenda Jackson (born 1936), two-time Academy Award-winning British actress, politician
Gordon Jackson (actor) (1923–1990), Scottish actor
Horace Jackson (1898–1952), American actor
Horace Jackson (filmmaker) (fl.1963 - 1976), American filmmaker, and educator
Jeremy Jackson (born 1980), American actor
John Jackson (writer), British screenwriter
Jonathan Jackson (actor) (born 1982), American actor
Joshua Jackson (born 1978), Canadian-American actor
Kate Jackson (born 1948), American actress
Leonard Jackson (actor) (1928–2013), American stage and screen actor
Marion Jackson (1897–1962), American screenwriter 
Mick Jackson (director) (born 1943), British film director
Mike and Michelle Jackson, Australian children's TV entertainers
Paul Jackson (producer) (born 1947), British TV producer
Peter Jackson (born 1961), New Zealand director
Philip Jackson (actor) (born 1948), English actor
Sammy Jackson (1937–1995), American actor
Saoirse-Monica Jackson (born 1993), Irish actress
Samuel L. Jackson (born 1948), American actor
Shar Jackson (born 1976), American TV and film actress
Sherry Jackson (born 1942), American actress and child star
Skai Jackson (born 2002), American actress
Tom Jackson (actor) (born 1948), Canadian actor and singer
Victoria Jackson (born 1959), American actress and comedian

Music
The Jackson family, an American musical family consisting of:
 First generation:
 Joe Jackson (1928–2018), patriarch and manager
 Katherine Jackson (born 1930), matriarch
 Second generation:
 Rebbie Jackson (born 1950), American singer
 Jackie Jackson (born 1951), member of the Jackson 5
 Tito Jackson (born 1953), guitarist/vocalist of Jackson 5
 Jermaine Jackson (born 1954), member of the Jackson 5
 La Toya Jackson (born 1956)
 Marlon Jackson (born 1957), member of the Jackson 5
 Michael Jackson (1958–2009), singer-songwriter and dancer, member of the Jackson 5
 Randy Jackson (born 1961), member of the Jackson 5
 Janet Jackson (born 1966), singer-songwriter, widely recognized as a pop icon.
 Third generation:
 Tariano Adaryll Jackson (born 1973), son of Tito; member of 3T
 Taryll Adren Jackson (born 1975), son of Tito; member of 3T
 Sigmund Jackson, Jr. (born 1977), son of Jackie; better known as rapper DealZ
 Tito Joe Jackson (born 1978), son of Tito; member of 3T
Al Jackson, Jr. (1935–1975), American drummer
Alan Jackson (born 1958), American country music singer and songwriter
Andrew Jackson (recording engineer), British recording engineer
Anthony Jackson (musician) (born 1952), American bass player
Armand "Jump" Jackson (1917–1985), American R&B drummer, bandleader and songwriter
Bashar Jackson (1999–2020), American rapper and singer known professionally as Pop Smoke
Bob Jackson (musician) (born 1949), British musician
Bull Moose Jackson (1919–1989), American blues and R&B singer and saxophonist
Carl Jackson (born 1953), American musician
Chuck Jackson (1937–2023), American R&B singer
Curtis Jackson (born 1975), the American rapper 50 Cent
David Jackson (rock musician) (born 1947), British musician
Deon Jackson (1946–2014), American soul singer
Eddie Jackson (musician) (born 1961), American bass guitarist
Eddie Jackson (singer) (1926–2002), American country musician
Elly Jackson (born 1988), British singer, part of the band/duo La Roux
Francis Jackson (1917–2022), British composer and organist
Fred Jackson (saxophonist) (born 1929), American R&B and jazz saxophonist
Fred Jackson Jr. (born c. 1945), American jazz saxophonist
Freddie Jackson (born 1956), American soul singer
Fruteland Jackson (born 1953), American electric blues guitarist, singer and songwriter
George Pullen Jackson (1874–1953), American musician
Graham Jackson (British conductor) (1967–2012), British conductor
Henry Jackson (1956–2014), American rapper, known as Big Bank Hank
Jack Jackson (British radio) (1906–1978), British musician
Jerry Naylor Jackson (1939–2019), American musician, member of The Crickets
Jim Jackson (musician) (c. 1884–1937), American blues musician
J. J. Jackson (media personality) (1941–2004), American MTV VJ
J. J. Jackson (singer) (born 1941), American soul musician
Jennie Jackson (1852–1910), American singer
Joe Jackson (musician) (born 1954), British singer/songwriter
John Jackson (born 1977), American rapper, known as Fabolous
John Jackson (blues musician) (1924–2002), American blues musician
Johnny Jackson (musician) (1951–2006), American drummer
Kate Jackson (singer) (born 1979), British singer
Keenon Jackson (born 1990), American rapper known professionally as YG
Keisha Jackson (born 1965), American musician
Lee Jackson (blues musician) (1921–1979) American blues musician
Lee Jackson (bassist) (born 1943), British bass guitarist
Lee Jackson (composer) (born 1963), American composer
Leon Jackson (born 1988), Scottish musician
Mahalia Jackson (1911–1972), American gospel singer
Mark Jackson (musician) (born 1970), English musician
Mick Jackson (singer) (born 1947), English musician
Millie Jackson (born 1944), U.S. musician
Milt Jackson (1923–1999), U.S. jazz vibraphonist
Milton Jackson, British music producer
Ice Cube (born O'Shea Jackson in 1969), American rapper/actor 
O'Shea Jackson, Jr. (born 1991), American rapper/actor and son of Ice Cube
Papa Charlie Jackson (c. 1885–1938), American musician
Paul Jackson (bassist) (1947–2021), U.S. bass guitarist
Paul Jackson Jr. (born 1959), U.S. musician
Randy Jackson (born 1956), U.S. musician, judge on American Idol
Randy Jackson (Zebra) (born 1955), U.S. rock musician, frontman for the band Zebra
Roddy Jackson (1942–2022), U.S. rockabilly musician
Stevie Jackson (born 1969), Scottish musician
Stonewall Jackson (musician) (1932–2021), American country music singer
Tony Jackson (jazz musician) (1876–1920), U.S. composer
Tony Jackson (singer) (1938–2003), British singer
Vasti Jackson (born 1959), American blues musician and record producer 
Walter Jackson (singer) (1938–1983), American soul singer 
Wanda Jackson (born 1937), American singer, songwriter, and musician
William Jackson (Scottish composer) (born 1955)
William E. (Will) Jackson (born 1945), American Greenpeace activist and musician
New Orleans Willie Jackson, New Orleans jazz singer

Military
Arthur J. Jackson (1924–2017), U.S. Marine Corps officer, Medal of Honor recipient for actions during World War II
Charles Douglas Jackson (1902–1964), U.S. Army general, expert on psychological warfare
Conrad Feger Jackson (1813–1862), general in the Union Army in the American Civil War
Frederick George Jackson (1860–1938), British army officer and explorer
Henry Jackson (Continental Army general) (1747–1809), U.S. Army general in the Revolutionary War
Sir Henry Jackson (Royal Navy officer) (1855–1929), British First Sea Lord during World War I
Henry R. Jackson (1820–1898), Confederate general
Joe M. Jackson (1923–2019), U.S. Air Force officer, Medal of Honor recipient for actions during the Vietnam War
Mary M. Jackson, American vice admiral in the United States Navy
Sir Mike Jackson (British Army officer) (born 1944), British Army Chief of the General Staff
Norman Cyril Jackson (1919–1994), British RAF, recipient of the Victoria Cross
Philip Jackson (surveyor) (1802–1879), British naval officer and surveyor
Sir Stanley Jackson (1870–1947), British Army officer, cricketer, and politician
Thomas Jonathan Jackson known as Stonewall Jackson (1824–1863), Confederate general
William Jackson (Victoria Cross) (1897–1959), Australian Army, recipient of the Victoria Cross
Sir William Jackson (British Army officer) (1917–1999), British Army officer and Governor of Gibraltar
William Hicks Jackson (1835–1903), Confederate general

Politics

Andrew Jackson (1767–1845), seventh president of the United States of America
Burke Jackson (born 1949), American politician and rancher
Caroline Jackson (born 1946), Cornish politician
Colin Jackson (politician) (1921–1981), British MP
Derrick Jackson (politician) (born 1966), American politician
Ed Jackson (Tennessee politician) (born 1948), American politician.
Fitz Jackson, Jamaican politician

George Jackson (Canadian politician) (1808–1885), Canadian MP
George Jackson (Irish politician) (1761–1805), Irish MP
Sir George Duckett, 1st Baronet (1725–1822), born George Jackson, British MP
Giorgio Jackson (born 1987), Chilean politician
Glenda Jackson (born 1936), British politician
Gordon Jackson (politician) (born 1948), Scottish politician
Helen Jackson (politician) (born 1939), British politician
John Jackson (Derbyshire politician) (1919–1976), British politician
Sir John Jackson (engineer) (1851–1919), British politician
Linda Jackson (politician), mayor of Vaughan, Ontario
Lorna Jackson (1935–2002), mayor of Vaughan, Ontario
Peter Jackson (politician) (1928–2020), British politician
Richard Jackson (colonial agent) (c. 1721–1787), British politician
Robert V. Jackson (born 1946), British politician
Samuel Jacob Jackson (1848–1942), Canadian politician
Samuel Macauley Jackson (1851–1912), American clergyman, editor and author
Stewart Jackson (born 1965), British politician and adviser
Syd Jackson (politician) (1889–1941), Australian MP
William Jackson, 1st Baron Allerton (1840–1917), British politician
Willie Jackson (politician) (born 1961), New Zealand politician and broadcaster

U.S. politics and law
Alphonse J. Jackson (1927–2014), Louisiana African-American politician, father of Lydia Jackson
Alphonso Jackson (born 1945), 13th U.S. Secretary of Housing and Urban Development
Barney Jackson (1904–1971), Washington politician
Charles Jackson (judge) (1775–1855), Massachusetts Supreme Court judge
Charles Jackson (Rhode Island politician) (1797–1876), Governor of Rhode Island
Claiborne Fox Jackson (1806–1862), Governor of Missouri
Darrell Jackson (politician) (born 1957), South Carolina state senator
David Jackson (delegate) (1747–1801), delegate to the Continental Congress
David S. Jackson (1813–1872), U.S. Representative from New York
Douglas S. Jackson (born 1954), Tennessee state senator
Edward B. Jackson (1793–1826), U.S. Representative from Virginia
Edward L. Jackson (1873–1954), Governor of Indiana
Frank D. Jackson (1854–1938), Governor of Iowa
Frank G. Jackson (born 1946), 57th mayor of Cleveland, Ohio
Fred S. Jackson (1868–1931), U.S. Representative from Kansas
George Jackson (Virginia) (1757–1831), U.S. Representative from Virginia
George Jackson (Black Panther) (1941–1971), American leader of the Black Panther Party
Giles Beecher Jackson (1853–1924), African-American lawyer, newspaper publisher, entrepreneur, and civil rights activist
Hancock Lee Jackson (1796–1876), Governor of Missouri
Henry M. Jackson (1912–1983), U.S. Representative and Senator from Washington
Howell Edmunds Jackson (1832–1895), U.S. Senator from Tennessee
Jabez Young Jackson (1790–1839), U.S. Representative from Georgia
Jacob B. Jackson (1829–1893), Governor of West Virginia
James Jackson (Georgia politician) (1757–1806), U.S. Representative and Senator from Georgia
James Jackson (congressman) (1819–1887), U.S. Representative from Georgia
James Jackson, Jr. (New York) (c. 1826–1891), mayor of Lockport, New York
James M. Jackson (1825–1901), U.S. Representative from West Virginia
James S. Jackson (1823–1862), U.S. Representative from Kentucky
Jerry D. Jackson (born 1941), American politician
Jesse Jackson (born 1941), civil rights leader
Jesse Jackson, Jr. (born 1965), son of Jesse Jackson and U.S. Representative from Illinois
John Jackson (Tampa) (1809–1887), 9th mayor of Tampa, Florida
John Jackson (law professor) (1932–2015), law professor at Georgetown University
John G. Jackson (politician) (1777–1825), U.S. Representative from Virginia
John Jay Jackson, Jr. (1824–1907), federal judge from West Virginia
Jonathan Jackson (delegate) (1743–1810), delegate to the Continental Congress from Massachusetts
Joseph Webber Jackson (1796–1854), U.S. Representative from Georgia and mayor of Savannah, Georgia
Lydia P. Jackson (born 1960), African-American Louisiana legislator, daughter of Alphonse J. Jackson
Maynard Jackson (1938–2003), mayor of Atlanta, Georgia
Mike Jackson (Texas politician) (born 1953), Texas state senator
Mortimer M. Jackson (1809–1889) Wisconsin jurist and diplomat
Noyes L. Jackson (1860–1933), Illinois state representative
Omer Stokes Jackson (1884–1940), 28th Indiana Attorney General
Oscar Lawrence Jackson (1840–1920), U.S. Representative from Pennsylvania
Richard E. Jackson (born 1945), mayor of Peekskill, New York
Richard Jackson, Jr. (1764–1838), U.S. Representative from Rhode Island
Robert Jackson (New York politician), New York City Council member
Robert E. Jackson, mayor of Largo, Florida
Robert H. Jackson (1892–1954), Supreme Court Justice and chief Nuremberg Trials prosecutor
Samuel D. Jackson (1895–1951), U.S. Representative from Indiana
Sandi Jackson (born 1963), Chicago alderman
Sheila Jackson Lee (born 1950), U.S. Representative from Texas
Tito Jackson (politician), member of the Boston City Council
William Jackson (secretary) (1759–1828), secretary to the U.S. Constitutional Convention
William Jackson (Massachusetts) (1783–1855), U.S. Representative from Massachusetts
William Harding Jackson (1901–1971), U.S. National Security Advisor
William Humphreys Jackson (1839–1915), U.S. Representative from Maryland
William Purnell Jackson (1868–1939), U.S. Senator from Maryland
William Schuyler Jackson (died 1932), New York State Attorney General
William T. Jackson (1876–1933), mayor of Toledo, Ohio
William Terry Jackson (1794–1882), U.S. Representative from New York

Science
A.C. Jackson (died 1921), American surgeon
Charles Loring Jackson (1847–1935), American organic chemist
Charles Thomas Jackson (1805–1880), American geologist
Cyril V. Jackson (1903–1988), South African astronomer
Daniel Jackson (computer scientist) (born 1963), American computer scientist
David M. Jackson, Canadian mathematician
Derek A. Jackson (1906–1982), atomic physicist, radar expert in the RAF during WWII
Douglas N. Jackson (1929–2004), American psychologist
Dunham Jackson (1888–1946), mathematician
Frank Cameron Jackson (born 1943), Australian philosopher
Frank Hilton Jackson (1870–1960), English mathematician
Frederick John Jackson (1859–1929), English explorer and ornithologist
Sir Henry Jackson, Baronet (1875–1937), British mineralogist
James A. Jackson (born 1954), British geologist
James Caleb Jackson (1811–1895), American inventor
James R. Jackson (1924–2011), American mathematician
John David Jackson (physicist) (1925–2016), Canadian-American physicist
John Jackson (astronomer) (1887–1958), Scottish astronomer
John Angelo Jackson (1921–2005), English mountaineer and explorer
John Hughlings Jackson (1835–1911), neurologist
Julian T. Jackson (born 1954), British historian
Nancy B. Jackson (1956–2022), American chemist and scientist
Peter Wyse Jackson (born 1955), Irish botanist
Raymond Carl Jackson (1928–2008), American botanist and plant geneticist
Robert Jackson (scientist) (born 1949), American astronomer
Shirley Jackson (physicist) (born 1946), president of Rensselaer Polytechnic Institute
Sidney William Jackson (1873–1946), Australian ornithologist
Steve Jackson (mathematician), American mathematician
Wes Jackson (born 1936), founder and president of The Land Institute

Sports

Athletics
Barry Jackson (athlete) (born 1941), English track and field athlete
Bo Jackson (born 1962), former professional baseball and football player for the Kansas City Royals and Oakland Raiders
Colin Jackson (born 1967), Welsh 110m hurdle athlete
Emma Jackson (born 1988), English 800m runner
Marjorie Jackson (born 1931), Australian sprinter and former Governor of South Australia
Mark Jackson (athlete) (born 1969), Canadian track and field athlete

Baseball
Al Jackson (1935–2019), American baseball player
Alex Jackson (baseball) (born 1995), American baseball player
Andre Jackson (born 1996), American baseball player
Bill Jackson (baseball) (1881–1958), American baseball player
Conor Jackson (born 1982), American baseball player
Danny Jackson (born 1962), American Major League All-Star left-handed pitcher in the 1980s and 1990s
Darrell Jackson (baseball) (born 1956), American baseball player
Drew Jackson (born 1993), American baseball player
Edwin Jackson (born 1983), American baseball player
Grant Jackson (baseball) (1942–2021), American baseball player
Jay Jackson (baseball) (born 1987), American baseball player
Jim Jackson (baseball) (1877–1955), American baseball player
John W. Jackson (1858–1913), American baseball player, known as Bud Fowler
Larry Jackson (1931–1990), American baseball player
Lillian Jackson (1919–2003), All-American Girls Professional Baseball League player
Mike Jackson (left-handed pitcher) (born 1946), American baseball player
Mike Jackson (right-handed pitcher) (born 1964), American former longtime right-handed Major League relief pitcher in the 1980s, 1990s, and 2000s
Randy Jackson (baseball) (1926–2019), American baseball player
Reggie Jackson (born 1946), Hall of Fame American baseball player
Shoeless Joe Jackson (1888–1951), American baseball player
Steven Jackson (baseball) (born 1982), American baseball player
Travis Jackson (1903–1987), American baseball shortstop in the 1920s and 1930s
Zach Jackson (born 1983), American baseball player
Zach Jackson (born 1994), American baseball player

Basketball
Bobby Jackson (basketball) (born 1973), American basketball player
Brittany Jackson (born 1983), American basketball player
 Chris W. Jackson (born 1969), American basketball player now known as Mahmoud Abdul-Rauf
 Demetrius Jackson (born 1994), American professional basketball player for the Houston Rockets
Greg Jackson (basketball, born 1952) (died 2012), American basketball player for the Phoenix Suns and New York Knicks
Greg Jackson (basketball, born 1959), American basketball coach for North Carolina Central and Delaware State
Jaren Jackson (born 1967), American basketball player
Jeff Jackson (basketball) (born 1961), American basketball coach
Jermaine Jackson (basketball) (born 1976), American basketball player
Jim Jackson (basketball) (born 1970), American basketball player
Lauren Jackson (born 1981), Australian professional basketball player
Lucious Jackson (1941–2022), American basketball player
Marc Jackson (born 1975), American basketball player
Maree Jackson (born 1954), Australian basketball player
Mark Jackson (basketball) (born 1965), American basketball player
Mervin Jackson (1946–2012), American basketball player
Michael Jackson (basketball) (born 1964), American basketball player
Phil Jackson (born 1945), American basketball coach
Pierre Jackson (born 1991), American basketball player
Ralph Jackson (born 1962), American basketball player
Rick Jackson (born 1989), American basketball player
Stanley Jackson (basketball) (born 1975), American basketball player
Stephen Jackson (born 1978), American basketball player
Stuart Wayne Jackson (born 1955), American basketball player, coach, NBA executive
Tiffany Jackson (basketball) (1985–2022), American basketball player and coach
Tony Jackson (basketball, born 1942) (died 2005), American basketball player in the ABL and ABA
Tony Jackson (basketball, born 1958), American basketball player for the Los Angeles Lakers
Traevon Jackson (born 1992), American basketball player; son of fellow basketball player Jim Jackson
Troy Jackson (1976–2011), American basketball player

Boxing
Luke Jackson (boxer) (born 1985), Australian boxer
David Jackson (boxer) (1955–2004), New Zealand boxer
John Jackson (English boxer) (1769–1845), English boxer
John Jackson (Virgin Islands boxer) (born 1989), U.S. Virgin Islands boxer
John David Jackson (boxer) (born 1962), American boxer
Julian Jackson (boxer) (born 1960), U.S. Virgin Islands boxer
Julius Jackson (born 1987), U.S. Virgin Islands boxer
Peter Jackson (boxer) (1861–1901), Australian boxer
Phil Jackson (boxer) (born 1964), American boxer
Sugar Jackson (born 1981), Belgian boxer

Cricket
Archie Jackson (1909–1933), Australian cricketer
Curtis Jackson (cricketer) (born 1967), Bermudian cricketer
George Jackson (cricketer), English cricketer
Guy Jackson (1896–1966), English cricketer
John Jackson (cricketer, born 1833) (1833–1901), English cricketer
John Jackson (Lancashire cricketer) (1841–1906), English cricketer
John Jackson (Worcestershire cricketer) (1880–1968), English cricketer
John Jackson (Somerset cricketer) (1898–1958), Chilean cricketer
Les Jackson (cricketer) (1921–2007), English cricketer
Paul Jackson (Australian cricketer) (born 1961), Australian cricketer
Paul Jackson (Irish cricketer) (born 1959), Irish cricketer
Peter Jackson (cricketer) (1911–1999), British cricketer
Samuel Jackson (cricketer) (1849–1941), English cricketer

Association football
A Jackson (fl. late 19th century), English footballer
Alan Jackson (footballer) (born 1938), English footballer
Alex Jackson (footballer, born 1905) (died 1946), Scottish footballer
Andy Jackson (footballer, born 1891), Scottish footballer
Andy Jackson (footballer, born 1988), Scottish footballer
Bob Jackson (football manager), English football manager
Colin Jackson (Scottish footballer) (1946–2015), Scottish footballer
Darren Jackson (born 1966), Scottish footballer
David Jackson (footballer, born 1937), English footballer
Dick Jackson (born c. 1878), Scottish footballer
Elphinstone Jackson (1868–1945), English footballer and co-founder of Indian Football Association in 1893
Ernest Jackson (footballer) (1914–1996), English footballer
Henry Jackson (football manager) (c. 1850–1930), English football manager
James Jackson (footballer, born 1900) (died c. 1976), British footballer
Jamie Jackson (footballer) (born 1986), English footballer
Jimmy Jackson (footballer, born 1875), Scottish-Australian footballer
John Jackson (footballer, born 1923) (1923–1992), English footballer
John Jackson (footballer, born 1942), English footballer
John Jackson (Scottish footballer) (1906–1965), Scottish footballer
Johnnie Jackson (born 1982), English footballer
Mark Jackson (footballer, born 1977), English footballer
Matt Jackson (born 1971), English footballer
Michael Jackson (footballer, born 1973), English footballer
Michael Jackson (footballer, born 1980), English footballer
Peter Jackson (footballer, born 1905) (died 1986), English footballer
Peter Jackson (footballer, born 1937) (died 1991), English footballer
Peter Jackson (footballer, born 1961), English footballer
Richard Jackson (footballer, born 1900), English footballer
Richard Jackson (footballer, born 1980), English footballer
Tommy Jackson (footballer, born 1898) (died 1975), English footballer
Tommy Jackson (footballer, born 1946), Northern Irish footballer
Wattie Jackson, Scottish footballer

Australian rules football
All individuals listed here are Australian unless otherwise indicated.

Edward Jackson (footballer) (1925–1996)
Jim Jackson (Australian rules footballer) (1890–1976)
Mark "Jacko" Jackson (born 1959), also an actor
Syd Jackson (footballer, born 1944)

Gridiron football
Adoree' Jackson (born 1995), American football player
Andrew Jackson (linebacker) (born 1992), American football player
Alonzo Jackson (born 1980), American football player
Asa Jackson (born 1989), American football player
Bennett Jackson (born 1991), American football player
Billy Jackson (American football) (born 1959), American football player
Blake Jackson (born 1994), American football player
Bo Jackson (born 1962), American football and baseball player
Bobby Jackson (American football coach) (born 1940), American football coach
Bobby Jackson (cornerback) (born 1956), American football player
Brandon Jackson (American football) (born 1985), American football player
Buddy Jackson (born 1989), American football player
Chad Jackson (born 1985), American football player
Charles Jackson (linebacker) (born 1965), American football player
Charles Jackson (defensive back) (born 1962), American football player
Charlie Jackson (American football coach) (born 1976), American football coach
Charlie Jackson (defensive back) (born 1936), American football player
Darrell Jackson (born 1978), American football player
DeSean Jackson (born 1986), American football player
D'Marco Jackson (born 1998), American football player
Donte Jackson (American football) (born 1995), American football player
D'Qwell Jackson (born 1983), American football player
Drake Jackson (born 2001), American football player
Earnest Jackson (born 1959), American football player
Eddie Jackson (American football, born 1980), American football player
Eddie Jackson (safety) (born 1993), American football player
Edwin Jackson (American football) (1991–2018), American football player
Frank Jackson (American football) (born 1939), American football player
Fred Jackson (running back) (born 1981), American football player
Gabe Jackson (born 1991), American football player
Harold Jackson (American football) (born 1946), American football player
Honor Jackson (born 1948), American football player
James Jackson (American football) (born 1976), American football player
J. C. Jackson (born 1995), American football player
Joey Jackson (born 1950), American football player
John Jackson (offensive tackle) (born 1965), American football player
John Jackson (wide receiver) (born 1967), American football player
Johnnie Jackson (American football) (born 1967), American football player
Jonah Jackson (born 1997), American football player
Jonathan Jackson (linebacker) (born 1977), American football player
Jonathan Jackson (defensive end) (born 1982), American football player
Josh Jackson (cornerback) (born 1996), American football player
Justin Jackson (American football) (born 1996), American football player
Keith Jackson (tight end) (born 1965), American football player
Keith Jackson (defensive tackle) (born 1985), American football player (son of the tight end of the same name)
Lamar Jackson (born 1997), American football player
Lamar Jackson (cornerback) (born 1998), American football player
Malik Jackson (defensive end) (born 1990), American football player
Mark Jackson (wide receiver) (born 1963), American football player
Mark Jackson (American football coach) (born 1972), American football coach
Marlin Jackson (born 1983), American football player
Michael Jackson (linebacker) (born 1957), American football player
Michael Jackson (wide receiver) (born 1969), American football player
Randy Jackson (offensive lineman) (born 1944), American football player
Randy Jackson (running back) (1948–2010), American football player
Jervonte Jackson (born 1986), American football player
Rich Jackson (born 1941), American football player
Rob Jackson (American football) (born 1985), American football player
Robert Jackson (guard) (born 1953), American football player
Robert Jackson (linebacker) (born 1954), American football player
Roger Jackson (wide receiver) (born 1989), American football player
Steve Jackson (defensive back) (born 1969), American football player
Steven Jackson (born 1983), American football player
Steven Jackson (fullback) (born 1984), American football player
Russ Jackson (born 1936), Canadian football player
Stanley Jackson (American football) (born 1975), American football player
Steve Jackson (linebacker) (born 1942), American football player
Tanard Jackson (born 1985), American football player
Tarron Jackson (born 1998), American football player
Tarvaris Jackson (1983–2020), American football player
Terry Jackson (cornerback) (born 1955), American football player
Terry Jackson (running back) (born 1976), American football player
T. J. Jackson (wide receiver) (1943–2007), American football player
T. J. Jackson (defensive tackle) (born 1983), American football player
Tom Jackson (American football, born 1951), former American football player and ESPN analyst
Tony Jackson (American football) (born 1982), American football player
Tre' Jackson (born 1992), American football player
Trishton Jackson (born 1998), American football player
Tyree Jackson (born 1997), American football player
Vincent Jackson (1983–2021), American football player
William Jackson III (born 1992), American football player
Willie Jackson (American football) (born 1971), American football player

Ice hockey
Art Jackson (1915–1971), NHL professional hockey player
Harvey Busher Jackson (1911–1966), Canadian ice hockey player
Jeff Jackson (ice hockey, born 1955), American ice hockey coach
Jeff Jackson (ice hockey, born 1965), Canadian NHL hockey player
Jim Jackson (ice hockey) (born 1960), Canadian ice hockey player
Les Jackson (ice hockey) (born 1952), Canadian hockey executive
Todd Jackson (born 1981), American ice hockey player

Rugby
Dirk Jackson (1885–1976), South African rugby union player and cricketer
Frederick Stanley Jackson (died 1957), Cornish rugby union player
Glen Jackson (rugby union) (born 1975), New Zealand rugby union player and referee
Josh Jackson (rugby league) (born 1991), Australian Rugby League player
Lee Jackson (rugby league), British rugby league footballer
Paddy Jackson, Irish rugby union footballer
Paul Jackson (rugby league) (born 1978), English rugby league footballer
Peter Jackson (rugby league) (1964–1997), Australian rugby league footballer
Peter Jackson (rugby union) (1930–2004), British rugby union footballer
Phil Jackson (rugby league, born 1932), British rugby player
Rob Jackson (born 1981), English rugby league player
Ruaridh Jackson (born 1988), Scottish rugby union player
Steve Jackson (rugby league) (born 1965), Australian rugby league player

Other sports
Ashley Jackson (born 1987), English hockey player
Bob Jackson (swimmer) (born 1957), American swimmer
Emma Jackson (born 1991), Australian triathlete
Eugene Jackson (born 1966), American mixed martial artist
Ezekiel Jackson (born 1978), the ring name of Guyanese-American professional wrestler Rycklon Stephens
Francia Jackson (born 1975), Dominican Republic volleyball player
Gus Jackson (1903–1968), New Zealand rower
Jamea Jackson (born 1986), American tennis player
Jeremy Jackson (fighter) (born 1982), American martial artist
Jim Jackson (sportscaster) (born 1963), American sportscaster
Jimmy Jackson (driver) (1910–1984), American racecar driver
Jimmy Jackson (wrestler) (1956–2008), Canadian-American wrestler
Johnnie O. Jackson (born 1971), American bodybuilder
Joseph Jackson (sport shooter) (1880–1960), American sports shooter
Keith Jackson (1928–2018), longtime American sportscaster on ABC
Laurence Jackson (1900–1984), Scottish curler
Linda Jackson (cyclist) (born 1958), Canadian cyclist
Mat Jackson (born 1981), English racing driver
Matt and Nick Jackson, ring names of American professional wrestlers Matthew (born 1985) and Nicholas Massie (born 1989), collectively known as The Young Bucks
Peter Jackson (table tennis) (born 1964), New Zealand table tennis player
Peter H. Jackson (1913–1983), British rower
Quinton Jackson (born 1978), American mixed martial arts fighter
Scoop Jackson (writer) (born 1963), American sports journalist
Sheila Jackson (born 1957), English chess master
Trina Jackson (born 1977), American freestyle swimmer
William Jackson (curler) (1871–1955), Scottish curler

Visual arts and design
Ashley Jackson (born 1940), British painter
Bill Jackson (photographer) (born 1953), British photographer
Edward Jackson (photographer) (1885–1967), American photographer
Herb Jackson (born 1945), American abstract painter
Jack Jackson (1941–2006), American cartoonist Jaxon
John Jackson (painter) (1778–1831), British painter
Lily Irene Jackson (1848–1928), American artist
Leon Quincy Jackson (1926/1927–1995), American architect and professor
Mason Jackson (1819–1903), British wood-engraver
May Howard Jackson (September 7, 1877–1931), African-American sculptor
Muriel Amy Jackson (1902–1989), English artist, illustrator
Nicola Jackson (artist) (born 1960), New Zealand artist
Oliver Lee Jackson (born 1935), African American painter, printmaker, sculptor, and educator
Philip Jackson (sculptor) (born 1944), Scottish sculptor
Raymond Jackson ("JAK") (1927–1997), English cartoonist
Richard Jackson (artist) (born 1939), American artist
Robert C. Jackson (born 1964), American painter and author
Robert H. Jackson (photographer) (born 1935), American photographer
Samuel Jackson (artist) (1794–1869), English artist
Ted Jackson (born 1955), prize-winning American photographer
Vanessa Jackson (born 1953), English artist
William Henry Jackson (1843–1942), American artist and photographer

Other
Adre-Anna Jackson, American female murder victim
Alan Jackson (broadcaster) (1915–1976), American radio broadcaster
Alan Jackson (poet) (born 1938), Scottish poet
Andrew Jackson, Sr. (died 1767), father of U.S. president Andrew Jackson
Ashley Jackson, British historian
Autumn Jackson (born 1973), American criminal
Charles H. Jackson, Jr. (1898–1978), American rancher, investor and polo player
Charles James Jackson (1849–1923), British businessman
Charles R. Jackson (1902–1968), American writer
Charles Samuel Jackson (1860–1924), American newspaper publisher
Charlie Jackson (software) (born 1948), American software entrepreneur
Cindy Jackson (born 1955), Guinness World Record holder for having the most cosmetic procedures
Cummins Jackson (1802–1849), uncle of Confederate general Stonewall Jackson
David Edward Jackson (1788–1837), American explorer
David Noyes Jackson (1922–2001), American writer
Donald Dean Jackson (1919–1987), American historian
Douglas Jackson (businessman) (born 1957), American businessman
Sir Edward Jackson (diplomat) (1925–2002), British diplomat
Edward Jackson (manufacturer) (1799–1872), Canadian businessman
Emelia Jackson (born 1989), Australian pastry chef
Esther Cooper Jackson (1917-2022), African-American civil rights activist and sosial worker
Sir Geoffrey Jackson (1915–1987), British diplomat
Sir Gordon Jackson (businessman) (1924–1991), Australian businessman
Rev. Dr. H. Dale Jackson (1930–2003), American clergyman, denominational leader and ethicist
Hal Jackson (1914–2012), American DJ and radio personality
Harvey Jackson III (born 1943), American historian
Helen Hunt Jackson (1830–1885), American novelist and poet
Henry Jackson (businessman) (born 1964), British-American businessman and investor
Sir Henry Moore Jackson (1849–1908), British colonial governor
Holbrook Jackson (1874–1948), British writer
Holly Jackson, British writer
Honoré Jackson (1861–1952), Canadian revolutionary
Jack Edward Jackson or Jaxon (1941–2006), American cartoonist, illustrator, historian, and writer
Jennifer Jackson (model) (born 1945), first African-American Playmate of the Month, March 1965 Playboy
Jennifer Lyn Jackson (born 1969), Playmate of the Month, April 1989 Playboy
Jeremy Jackson (author), American author
Joe Jackson, Sr. (1873–1942), Austrian clown
John Jackson (bishop) (1811–1886), English bishop
John Edward Jackson (antiquarian) (1805–1891)
John G. Jackson (writer) (1907–1993), American historian and writer
Jonathan P. Jackson (1953–1970), brother of Black Panther George Jackson and instigator of 1970 Marin County Courthouse incident
Joseph H. Jackson (c. 1905–1990), American clergyman
Kenneth H. Jackson (1909–1991), English linguist
MacDonald P. Jackson (born 1938), New Zealand academic
Michael Jackson (Anglican bishop) (born 1956), Irish bishop
Michael Jackson (journalist), Niuean journalist
Michael Jackson (radio commentator) (1934–2022), American radio commentator
Michael Jackson (writer) (1942–2007), British journalist
Mick Jackson (author) (born 1960), British author
Oliver Toussaint Jackson (1862–1948), American businessman
Patrick Tracy Jackson (1780–1847), Boston merchant
Paul Jackson (poker player) (born c. 1965), English poker player
Peter Jackson (academic), Australian academic
Peter Jackson (fashion designer) (1928–2008), Australian fashion designer
Peter Jackson (historian), British historian
Rachel Jackson (1767–1828), wife of U.S. president Andrew Jackson
Rebecca Cox Jackson (1795–1871), African-American religious activist
Richard Jackson (artist) (born 1939), American artist
Sir Robert Jackson (UN administrator) (1911–1991), Australian administrator for the United Nations
Robin Jackson (1948–1998), Northern Irish loyalist and Ulster Volunteer Force leader
Rupert Jackson (born 1948), Lord Justice of Appeal of England and Wales
Samuel Macauley Jackson (1851–1912), American clergyman, editor and author
Sarah Yorke Jackson (1803–1887), daughter-in-law of U.S. president Andrew Jackson
Sheldon Jackson (1934–1909), American Presbyterian clergyman and missionary
Shirley Jackson (1916–1965), American author
Steve Jackson (thriller writer) (born 1969), Scottish writer
Steve Jackson (British game designer) (born 1951), UK game designer
Steve Jackson (American game designer) (born c. 1953), U.S. game designer
Valerie Jackson (born 1949), American radio host, widow of Atlanta mayor Maynard Jackson
Vickie Dawn Jackson (born 1966), American serial killer
William Jackson (Canadian administrator)
William Jackson (gangster) (1920–1961), American mobster
William Jackson (pirate), English pirate
William Turrentine Jackson (1915–2000), American historian

Middle name
Eleanor Jackson Piel (1920-2022), American lawyer

Multiple people with the same given name 
 Austin Jackson (disambiguation)
 Chris Jackson (disambiguation)
 Dane Jackson (disambiguation)
 Jordan Jackson (disambiguation)
 Michael Jackson (disambiguation)
 Theo Jackson (disambiguation)
 Thomas Jackson (disambiguation)
 Tim Jackson (disambiguation), including Timothy Jackson

Given name

Jackson (footballer, born 1973), Jackson Coelho Silva, Brazilian footballer
Jackson (footballer, born 1984), Jackson Jose Lucas, Brazilian footballer
Jackson (footballer, born 1987), Antonio Jackson de Oliveira Alcántara, Brazilian footballer
Jackson (footballer, born 1988), Jackson Henrique Gonçalves Pereira, Brazilian footballer
Jackson (footballer, born 1 May 1990), Jackson de Souza, Brazilian footballer
Jackson (footballer, born 11 May 1990), Jackson Alan Tibolla Rodrigues, Brazilian footballer
Jackson (footballer, born August 1990), Jackson Fernando de Sousa, Brazilian footballer
Jackson (footballer, born 1991), Jackson Ferreira Silvério, Brazilian footballer
Jackson (footballer, born 1999), Jackson Kenio Santos Laurentino, Brazilian footballer
Jackson Barton (born 1995), American football player
Jackson Browne (born 1948), American singer
Jackson Carman (born 2000), American football player
Jackson Mutero Chirenje (1935–1988), Zimbabwean historian
Jackson Davis (disambiguation), multiple people
Jackson Emery (born 1987), American basketball player
Jackson C. Frank (1943–1999), American singer-songwriter
Jackson "Jacko" Gill (born 1994), New Zealand shot putter
Jackson Harris, American pop singer
Jackson Kabiga (born 1976), Kenyan long-distance runner
Jackson Lee Benge or Jaxson Benge, American guitarist
Jackson Pollock (1912–1956), American abstract painter
Jackson Proskow, Canadian journalist
Jackson Rathbone (born 1984), actor notable for playing Jasper Hale in the Twilight film franchise, and frontman of band 100 Monkeys
Jackson Martínez (born 1986), Colombian footballer who plays for FC Porto and the Colombia national football team
Jakson Coelho (born 1986), Brazilian footballer known as Jajá
Jackson Wang (born 1994), Hong Kong sabre fencing representative, Hong Kong member of Korean hip hop group GOT7

Fictional characters

Surname
Alan Jackson (The Sarah Jane Adventures), a character in The Sarah Jane Adventures
Daniel Jackson (Stargate), a character in the film Stargate and the subsequent television series
Pvt. Daniel Jackson, character in the 1998 war film Saving Private Ryan
Jayson Jackson, a character in the Netflix series Grand Army
Maria Jackson, a character in The Sarah Jane Adventures
Percy Jackson, the main protagonist and narrator of Percy Jackson & The Olympians and later also appears as one of the main characters in theHeroes of Olympus spinoff series
Sgt. Jericho Jackson, title character of the film Action Jackson
Jill and Jan Jackson, title characters of the American comic strip The Jackson Twins
Sgt. Paul Jackson, fictional US Marine in Call of Duty 4: Modern Warfare
Steve Jackson, a minor character in the 1985 American science fantasy movie Explorers
Roland Jackson, in the 1997 animated TV show Extreme Ghostbusters

Various characters in the TV series EastEnders:
 Alan Jackson (EastEnders)
 Bianca Jackson
 Billie Jackson
 Blossom Jackson
 Carol Jackson
 Chloe Jackson
 Kai Jackson
 Robbie Jackson
 Sonia Jackson

Given name
Jackson Avery, in the television series Grey's Anatomy
Jackson Belleville, a recurring character in the TV series Gilmore Girls
Jackson Bentley, in the 1962 film Lawrence of Arabia
Jackson Briggs or Jax (Mortal Kombat), in the Mortal Kombat fighting game series
Jackson Brodie, main character in a series of crime novels by UK author Kate Atkinson
Jackson Curtis, in the film 2012
Jackson "Jack" Darby, in the animated TV series Transformers: Prime
Jackson Healy, in the 2016 film The Nice Guys
Jackson Kenner, in The CW TV show The Originals
Jackson Maine, main protagonist of the 2018 remake of A Star Is Born
Jackson Oz, the protagonist of the Zoo novel series by James Patterson and later the TV series Zoo
Jackson Stewart (character), in the TV series Hannah Montana
Jackson Storm, main antagonist of the film Cars 3
Jackson "Jax" Teller, main character in the TV series Sons Of Anarchy
Jackson Whittemore, in the MTV TV show Teen Wolf

See also
 Justice Jackson (disambiguation)
 Jacksen, given name
 Jacson, given name and surname
 Jaxon (name), given name and surname
 Jaxson, given name
 Jack (name)

References

Surnames of English origin
Surnames of Scottish origin
English-language surnames
Patronymic surnames
English masculine given names